Public School No. 19, also known as St. Hedwig's High School, is a historic elementary school building located at Wilmington, New Castle County, Delaware. It was built in 1881, and is a two-story, cruciform-shaped brick building in the Italianate style.  It has a low hipped roof and a heavy wood pediment is trimmed with elongated dentils and bracketed cornice returns.  It operated as a public school until leased to St. Hedwig's Roman Catholic Church for use as a Catholic high school. St. Hedwig's High School closed in the 1970s and the building converted to offices.

It was added to the National Register of Historic Places in 1984.

References

School buildings on the National Register of Historic Places in Delaware
Italianate architecture in Delaware
School buildings completed in 1881
Schools in Wilmington, Delaware
Defunct high schools in Delaware
National Register of Historic Places in Wilmington, Delaware
1881 establishments in Delaware